Windeyer County is one of the 141 Cadastral divisions of New South Wales. It is located between the Darling River and the border with South Australia. The Silver City Highway runs through it. Coombah Roadhouse is located there.

Windeyer County was named in honour of the barrister and politician Richard Windeyer (1806-1847).

Parishes within this county
A full list of parishes found within this county; their current LGA and mapping coordinates to the approximate centre of each location is as follows:

References

Counties of New South Wales